Gordon Sim is a Canadian set decorator.

Oscar nominations
Both of these are in Best Art Direction

75th Academy Awards-Chicago, nomination shared with John Myhre. Won.
82nd Academy Awards-Nine, nomination shared with John Myhre. Lost to Avatar.
91st Academy Awards-Mary Poppins Returns, nomination shared with John Myhre. Lost to Black Panther.

Selected filmography

 Sea of Love (1989)
 The Freshman (1990)
 Deceived (1991)
 F/X2 (1991)
 Life with Mikey (1993)
 Trapped in Paradise (1994)
 Tommy Boy (1995)
 The Hurricane (1999)
 Frequency (2000)
 Chicago (2002)
 Cinderella Man (2005)
 Hairspray (2007)
 Nine (2009)
 Pirates of the Caribbean: On Stranger Tides (2011)
 X-Men: Days of Future Past (2014)
 The Great Wall (2016)
 Mary Poppins Returns (2018)
 The Little Mermaid (2023)

References

External links

Best Art Direction Academy Award winners
Living people
Canadian set decorators
Year of birth missing (living people)
People from St. Thomas, Ontario